Magdalen Goffin, FRSL (23 July 1925 – 2015) was an English writer, born in Sheringham, Norfolk, England, UK. She was a Fellow of the Royal Society of Literature (FRSL) from 1980. She wrote biographies of her grandmother, Maria Pasqua, and her father, E. I. Watkin, and edited the diaries of another ancestor Absalom Watkin. Mrs. Goffin also wrote numerous articles and reviews for the New York Review of Books (1966–69).

Publications 
 Objections to Roman Catholicism. Constable, 1964. (contrib chapter "Superstition and Credulity")
 The Future of Catholic Christianity. Constable, 1966. (contrib chapter "The Broken Pitcher")
 Maria Pasqua. Oxford University Press, 1979. . Faber & Faber, 2009. .
 The Diaries of Absalom Watkin: A Manchester Man 1787-1861. Sutton Publishing,1993. .
 The Watkin Path - An Approach to Belief: The Life of E. I. Watkin. Sussex Academic Press, 2006. .

References

External links
Biodata at Debrett's

1925 births
2015 deaths
English biographers
Fellows of the Royal Society of Literature
People from Sheringham